Muhammad Azfar Arif bin Mohd Sukri  (born 21 April 1999) is a Malaysian professional footballer who plays as a goalkeeper for Malaysia Super League club Penang.

Club career

Penang
On 16 December 2022, Azfar joined Malaysia Super League club Penang.

References

External links

1999 births
People from Terengganu
UiTM FC players
Petaling Jaya City FC players
Penang F.C. players
Living people
Malaysian footballers
Association football goalkeepers